Playtime Is Over is the debut mixtape by Trinidadian-American rapper Nicki Minaj. It was released on July 5, 2007, through Dirty Money Records. It features guest performances from Hell Red, Red Café, Murda Mook, Ransom, Gravy, Lil Wayne, Angel De-Mar and Ru Spits.

Background 
After releasing five songs with the rap group The Hoodstars (a part of Full Force) Minaj left the group to pursue music independently. She uploaded music to Myspace and reached out to music producers. Through Myspace Minaj made contact with Fendi, CEO of Brooklyn label Dirty Money Entertainment. Fendi signed Minaj to Dirty Money Records, where Minaj featured on a DVD series called "The Come Up." Her appearance on "The Come Up" caught the attention of Lil Wayne, who contracted her to release her music with Young Money Entertainment.

Composition 
Minaj was involved in writing all of the lyrics on "Playtime Is Over". Her songs mostly feature either her or another artist rapping, with the chorus from the original instrumental removed. Most lyrics consist of either complicated wordplay or direct insults that establish Minaj as better than other rappers, and suggest that her music is worth listening to. It was argued that the lyrics of the mixtape are deeper than that of subsequent commercial singles.

Most of the instrumentals on "Playtime Is Over" are sampled from other, more popular songs, and original instrumentals are similar in style. The mixtape features rhythmic, synthesized beats with bass, in a 4/4 time signature. While Nicki Minaj's earlier commercial discography features pop-rap, "Playtime Is Over" is predominantly hip-hop music accompanied by fast-paced rapping. "Playtime Is Over" established many of the motifs that are present in Minaj's later work. As Minaj's first published work as an individual rapper, "Playtime Is Over" debuted Minaj use of alter egos such as "Nicki Lewinsky" and engagement with British cockney.

Release and promotion 
"Playtime Is Over" is the first in a series of mixtapes, all released without a major record label, that were marketed to establish a dedicated, core fan base who identified with the lifestyle described in her mixtape. Minaj established a small fan base before releasing "Playtime Is Over" by communicating with her fans online on Twitter, Myspace, and personal blogs. "Playtime Is Over" allowed Minaj to reach more hip-hop enthusiasts, and activity on social networking sites pushed her mixtapes into the mainstream. The vice president marketing at Minaj's management company said that, following the release of "Playtime Is Over," "We didn't position [Minaj] as music but as a lifestyle."

Commercial performance
In 2007, Minaj had released her debut single on the mixtape "Dreams '07" which charted on the USHot R&B/Hip-Hop Songs and Rap Songs at 97 and 82. This was Minaj's first debut entry on charts. Minaj's work gained attention from artists like Lil Wayne, Aubrey Drake Graham, Bird Man, lil kim, Gucci Mane, and Beyonce. Selling 12,711 in the same year. On 2015, the mixtape was certified gold by RIAA with 563,830 sales in streaming and purchases.

Public reception 
As one of the first up-and-coming female rappers in over a decade, Minaj's work received a lot of attention. Even though she was a female rapper in a male-dominated genre, "Playtime Is Over" focused on the mixtape's lyrical content and the public responded positively. Fans found her charismatic and serious about her work.

Critical reception 
After Minaj's release of "Playtime Is Over" (and the subsequent release of Sucka Free), her work garnered acclaim from many other artists, including Robin Thicke and Gucci Mane. In 2008, she received Female Artist of the Year from the Underground Music Awards. Minaj's early discography also got BET awards for Best New Artist and Best Female Hip Hop Artist, and got her nominated for a Teen Choice Award.

Legacy 
"Playtime Is Over" established Nicki Minaj's physical persona as popular and amiable, like a Barbie doll. In an article by MTV, Minaj stated that "We're going with the whole Barbie doll theme so I'm gonna be doing a lot of kooky poses because I have to look like a doll straight out the box. But I'm not a Barbie that needs to play—Playtime is Over." The cover of "Playtime Is Over" shows Minaj with pink lipstick in a pink plastic-looking case, which resembles a packaged barbie doll. However, the music in her mixtape created made Minaj appear aggressive and flaunting; she attacked other rappers directly and boasted about herself through her wordplay. I'm the fearless Barbie doll." MTV states that the two contrasting personalities allowed Minaj to relate to a wide audience, and were therefore instrumental to her success as an artist. "Playtime Is Over" was developed with the help of established artists. Minaj credits collaboration, especially with Lil Wayne, as extremely helpful in increasing the popularity of her albums. In addition, Minaj's early discography lead to high-profile features on songs by Wyclef Jean and Drake, which further increased her popularity.

"Playtime Is Over" is considered unique (compared to albums from other, similar female rappers) in that Minaj put a lot of emphasis on the content of the mixtape, instead of on her sex appeal. Minaj's continued emphasis on her lyrical content, instrumentals, and delivery are reasons why Billboard credits Minaj as being one of the most influential female rappers.

Track listing

References

2007 mixtape albums
Nicki Minaj albums